Mastanabad (also Romanized as Mastānābād) is a village in Yurchi-ye Gharbi Rural District, Kuraim District, Nir County, Ardabil Province, Iran. At the 2006 census, its population was 177, in 37 families.

References 

Towns and villages in Nir County